Antal Páger (29 January 1899 – 14 December 1986) was a Hungarian film actor. He appeared in 155 films between 1932 and 1986. He won the award for Best Actor at the 1964 Cannes Film Festival for his role in Drama of the Lark.

Selected filmography
 Judgment of Lake Balaton (1933)
 Emmy (1934)
 Tales of Budapest (1937)
 I defended a woman (1938)
 Rézi Friday (1938)
 Magda Expelled (1938)
 Istvan Bors (1939)
 Landslide (1940)
 One Night in Transylvania (1941)
 Háry János (1941)
 Dr. Kovács István (1942)
 Changing the Guard (1942)
 Yesterday (1959)
 I'll Go to the Minister (1962)
 Drama of the Lark (1963)
 Twenty Hours (1965)
 The Toth Family (1969)

References

External links

1899 births
1986 deaths
People from Makó
Hungarian male film actors
Cannes Film Festival Award for Best Actor winners